Eupithecia pieria is a moth in the family Geometridae first described by Hamilton Herbert Druce in 1893. It is found in Mexico and Bolivia.

The forewings are greyish brown, crossed by many fine greyish-white lines. The hindwings are dark greyish brown.

References

Moths described in 1893
pieria
Moths of Central America
Moths of South America